PCPA Stadium (Paramount Cricket Parmotion Association Stadium) is a cricket stadium located in the city of Santokhgarh in Himachal Pradesh. PCPA is Cricket Stadium of Cricket lovers, for Cricket lovers and by Cricket lovers. It only works for Cricket Excellence. It provides better platform to the youngsters to make their dreams true with modern way of play, advance training technique and real playing experience. It is not just a stadium or academy, but it reveals the talent of youngsters, sharpens it and converts it to their skill.

The stadium is home to Punjab, Himachal cricket teams matches and Cricket Coaching. It has large practice area, net pitches, cemented pitches and large cricket stadium and provides the different playing environment so one can face any challenge, anytime, anywhere.

PCPA Features
 India's largest practice area
 Largest cricket ground with International Standards
 Different kind of pitches such as grassy pitches, cemented pitches and hard pitches
 Advance training techniques and equipments
 Best cricket and fitness coaches
 Yoga classes

Cricket grounds in Himachal Pradesh
Buildings and structures in Una district
Sports venues completed in 2012
2012 establishments in Himachal Pradesh